Fredrik Johansson (born 14 July 1974) is a Swedish ski jumper. He competed in the normal hill and large hill events at the 1994 Winter Olympics.

References

External links
 

1974 births
Living people
Swedish male ski jumpers
Olympic ski jumpers of Sweden
Ski jumpers at the 1994 Winter Olympics
People from Heby Municipality
Sportspeople from Uppsala County